Gilbert Alexander Ralston (January 5, 1912 – March 18, 1999) was a British-American screenwriter, journalist and author. He was a television producer in the 1950s and a screenwriter in the 1960s. He created the television series The Wild Wild West and wrote scripts for Star Trek, Gunsmoke, Ben Casey, I Spy, Hawaii Five-O and Naked City.   He wrote the screenplay for the 1971 movie Willard, which was based on the 1968 novel Ratman's Notebooks written by Stephen Gilbert.

Early life and career
Ralston was born in 1912 in Newcastle, Ireland (now Northern Ireland) in the United Kingdom of Great Britain and Ireland (now the United Kingdom of Great Britain and Northern Ireland)

In the 1950s he worked as a television producer in the United States. In the 1960s, he worked as a television screenwriter, according to the IMDb website. Willard was nominated for an Edgar Allan Poe Award in 1972 for Best Motion Picture.

He died on March 18, 1999, in Mount Pleasant, South Carolina, of congestive heart failure.

Television screenwriter
Ralston was a screenwriter for many of the top television shows in the United States in the 1960s. He wrote the script for the 1967 Star Trek episode "Who Mourns for Adonais?", which is a line from Adonais (1821), the elegiac poem by Percy Bysshe Shelley. He also wrote scripts for Ben Casey, Laredo, I Spy, The Big Valley, Gunsmoke, The Naked City, Combat, Hawaii Five-O and The Wild Wild West

The Wild Wild West
Ralston helped create the television series The Wild Wild West and wrote the pilot episode, "The Night of the Inferno". In 1997, at the age of 85, Ralston sued Warner Brothers over the upcoming motion picture based on the series (Wild Wild West was released in 1999). In a deposition, Ralston explained that, in 1964, he was approached by producer Michael Garrison, who '"said he had an idea for a series, good commercial idea, and wanted to know if I could glue the idea of a western hero and a James Bond type together in the same show."

Ralston said he then created the Civil War characters, the format, the story outline and nine drafts of the script that was the basis for the television series. It was his idea, for example, to have a secret agent named Jim West who would perform secret missions for U.S. President Ulysses S. Grant.

Ralston's experience brought to light a common Hollywood practice of the 1950s and 1960s, where television writers who helped create popular series allowed producers or studios to take credit for said series, thus depriving the writers of any royalties.

Outcome of court case
Ralston died in 1999 before his lawsuit was settled. Warner Brothers ended up paying Ralston's family between $600,000 and $1.5 million.

Filmography

Films

Television

References

External links

1912 births
1999 deaths
American male screenwriters
American television producers
British male screenwriters
American television writers
British emigrants to the United States
People from County Down
People from Mount Pleasant, South Carolina
American male television writers
20th-century American businesspeople
Screenwriters from South Carolina
20th-century American male writers
20th-century American screenwriters
20th-century British screenwriters
Deaths from congestive heart failure